Samanta Bardini (born 27 February 1977) is an Italian softball player who competed in the 2004 Summer Olympics.

References

1977 births
Living people
Italian softball players
Olympic softball players of Italy
Softball players at the 2004 Summer Olympics
Sportspeople from Parma